Nacional Fast Clube, or Fast Clube, as they are usually called, is a Brazilian football team from Manaus in Amazonas, founded on 8 July 1930.

Fast is the second-best ranked team from Amazonas in CBF's national club ranking, behind Manaus.

History
The club was founded by a group of members and players of the Nacional, who commanded by the leader Vivaldo Lima and the player then captain of the team Rodolpho Gonçalves decided to leave the club. The reason for the discord was a political maneuver of the then president of the Nacional, Leopoldo Mattos with change of the statute of the Nacional on the eve of the presidential election, taking the players the right to vote. The athletes wanted Vivaldo Lima for the presidency, and were closed around the name of the doctor and leader. With the maneuver, the players, voided in their statutory rights, did not accept the imposition and decided to leave, with the idea of a new club, founded Fast and made of Vivaldo Lima the first president.

Thus, the new club already had as Nacional name, the initials NFC; The colors red, blue and white by virtue of the flag of the Amazonas, besides the yellow star to the center of the shield. The group then decided to consult the teacher Carlos Mesquita of the traditional Gimnasyo Amazonense Dom Pedro II, to suggest a name beginning with the letter F to differentiate itself from the old club. Thus, the English-speaking teacher christened the club the term "Fast", making an analogy to the speed and dexterity that the players who founded the new football association had on the pitch.

Rivalries

Fast Clube rivals are Nacional, Rio Negro and São Raimundo-AM. The biggest rival is Nacional, who make the derby called Pai vs. Filho (Father Vs. Son), due to the fact that the Fast Clube was founded by dissidents of the Nacional, and for that reason, the press at the time and the own fans of National nicknamed the derby thus.

Stadium

Fast Clube's stadium is Estádio da ULBRA, which has a maximum capacity of 4,000 people. Estádio Ismael Benigno and Arena da Amazônia also held several Fast Clube matches.

Honours
 Torneio do Norte
 Winners (1): 1970

 Campeonato Amazonense
 Winners (7): 1948, 1949, 1955, 1960, 1970, 1971, 2016

 Copa Amazonas
 Winners (1): 2015

References

External links
 Fast Clube in OGol.com
 Fast Clube in Torcedor de Vantagens

Association football clubs established in 1930
Fast Clube
Manaus
1930 establishments in Brazil